Foel-fras (944 m) is a mountain in the Carneddau range, about 10 km east of Bethesda in Wales. It lies on the border between the counties of Gwynedd and Conwy. With a summit elevation of 944 m it is officially the eleventh-highest summit in Wales.
Foel-fras is located at the northern end of the main ridge of the Carneddau, between Drum to the north and Foel Grach to the south, with the subsidiary summit of Garnedd Uchaf (925 m) between it and Foel Grach. Due south and 400 m below lies the reservoir of Llyn Dulyn, while the smaller reservoir of Llyn Anafon lies to the north.

Because of its position, it is the first of the Welsh 3000s reached when doing this walk from the northern end. It can be climbed by driving up the small road signposted "Aber Falls" in the village of Abergwyngregyn, passing the car park for the falls and continuing to a small car park at the end of the road. From there it is possible to take the track bearing left, later turning right to the summit of Drum and continuing along the ridge, or to take the track leading straight on to Llyn Anafon and then climbing up to the ridge between Drum and Foel Fras.

An alternate route up the mountain is to start at the Western end of the Bwlch-y-Ddeufaen pass and take the steep track up the side of Drosgyl, following the fence line all the way to where the ground levels off. Here the views open up and the fence changes direction, running off at almost a right angle to the Southeast (left). From here, follow a small track Southwest until it intersects the larger track previously mentioned - marked by a small quartz-peppered cairn - which will lead you to Drum. From Drum the walk to the summit of Foel Fras is simply parallel to the fence line, which changes into a dry stone wall as you are nearing the summit. Car parking is available at the Eastern end of the pass.

The summit plateau has some ornithological interest in that it is one of the best places in Wales to observe dotterel on their spring and less frequent autumn migration.

Foel Fras can also be reached from Llanfairfechan, an equally as beautiful route as that from Aber Falls. Follow the road up through the village of Llanfairfechan until Terrace Walk, take the path from Terrace Walk that takes you past Hengae Farm, then follow the path that can take you to the summit of Garreg Fawr, Drum, Foel Fras and more.

Similarly-named hills
There exist also Foel Fras in central Wales, south of Machynlleth, and Foel-fras in The Moelwyns, north east of Blaenau Ffestiniog.

References

External links
 

Mountains and hills of Snowdonia
Hewitts of Wales
Nuttalls
Mountains and hills of Conwy County Borough
Furths
Abergwyngregyn
Caerhun
Mountains and hills of Gwynedd